Bosmere and Claydon Rural District was a rural district within the administrative county of East Suffolk between 1894 and 1934. It was created out of the earlier Bosmere and Claydon rural sanitary district. It was named after the historic hundred of Bosmere and Claydon, although the rural district covered a significantly larger area than the hundred.

In 1934, under a County Review Order, Bosmere and Claydon Rural District was abolished. Apart from the detached Swilland parish (to Deben Rural District) it became part of the new Gipping Rural District, and in 1974 became part of Mid Suffolk district.

Statistics

Parishes
Bosmere and Claydon RD contained the parishes of Akenham, Ashbocking, Ashfield cum Thorpe, Badley, Barham, Barking, Battisford, Baylham, Bramford, Claydon, Coddenham, Creeting St Mary, Crowfield, Debenham, Flowton, Framsden, Gosbeck, Great Blakenham, Great Bricett, Helmingham, Hemingstone, Henley, Little Blakenham, Mickfield, Needham Market (created 1907), Nettlestead, Offton, Pettaugh, Ringshall, Somersham, Stonham Aspal, Stonham Earl, Stonham Parva, Swilland, Whitton, Willisham and Winston.

References

History of Suffolk
Districts of England created by the Local Government Act 1894
Rural districts of England